Theresa M. Claiborne is the first African-American female pilot in the United States Air Force (USAF).

Education 
Claiborne came from a military family and she went to University of California, Berkeley where she joined the Air Force Reserve Officers' Training Corps (ROTC). She realized she wanted to be a pilot while in the ROTC program. She completed her Undergraduate Pilot Training at Laughlin Air Force Base, Texas in 1982.

Career 

On June 20, 1981, Claiborne was commissioned as second lieutenant in the USAF. She became the first African-American female pilot in the U.S. Air Force after graduating from Laughlin Air Force Base on September 16, 1982 with the class 82-08. Claiborne flew KC–135 Stratotankers for Strategic Air Command for seven years. She left active duty in 1988. She served as an instructor pilot on the KC-135E and a flight commander for the USAF Reserves where she rose to the rank of lieutenant colonel. Claiborne also began working for United Airlines as a first officer in 1990. She would later be promoted to captain. She retired from the military on January 6, 2003 with over 3000 military flight hours.

In 2016, Claiborne co-founded the organization Sister of the Skies with pilots Christine Angel Hughes and Nia Wordlaw. Sisters of the Skies' mission is to support and build a more diverse next generation of aviation professionals by offering workshops, mentorships, and scholarships.

Awards 
Claiborne was inducted into the Organization of Black Aerospace Professionals Hall of Fame in 2017.

References 

Women aviators
Women in the United States Air Force
African-American women aviators
1959 births
Living people